Theodora Megale Komnene, (before 1253– after 1285), was Empress of Trebizond from 1284 to 1285. All Michael Panaretos tells us about her is that she was a daughter of Emperor Manuel I of Trebizond by Rusudan, a Georgian princess. Although some consider her Manuel's second wife, Michel Kuršanskis has argued that Rusudan may have been simply his mistress. Kuršanskis also notes that the evidence is insufficient to determine if Theodora was identical with one of the princesses of Trebizond mentioned in the Chronicle of Bishop Stephanos who married a noble or the king of Georgia, or if she had been a nun — much as Anna Anachoutlou was before her usurpation in the following century.

In 1284, with the help of Georgian King of Imereti, David VI Narin she managed to seize the crown from her half-brother, Emperor John II. John II may have taken refuge in Tripolis. Shortly afterwards she was defeated and John regained his throne, but she had managed to reign long enough to have minted her own coins. A few types of silver aspers and bronze nomismas are evidence that she was the only Empress of Trebizond to have coined money. Her fate after John's restoration is unknown. She fled Trebizond in 1285 and disappears from history thereafter; she might have gone into exile in Georgia, the homeland of her mother.

References

13th-century births
13th-century deaths
Grand Komnenos dynasty
13th-century emperors of Trebizond
13th-century women rulers
Eastern Orthodox monarchs
Empresses regnant of Trebizond
Year of birth unknown
Year of death unknown
13th-century monarchs in Asia
13th-century Byzantine people
13th-century Byzantine women
Princesses of Trebizond